Coody is a surname of Irish origin. Notable people with the surname include:

Ann Coody (born 1937), American politician
Charles Coody (born 1937), American professional golfer
Jeff Coody (born 1960), American politician
Jerry Coody (born 1931), Canadian football player

References

Surnames of Irish origin